Timehop is an application for smartphones that collects old photos and posts from Facebook, Instagram, Twitter, Apple Photos, Google Photos and Dropbox photos and distributes the past.
The company was founded in 2011 by Jonathan Wegener and Benny Wong. As of January 2016, Timehop had 12 million users.

History
Timehop began as 4SquareAnd7YearsAgo, which was created at Foursquare's Hackathon in February 2011. The original aim of the app was to build the service that would replay the past foursquare checkins in real-time. The product was simplified into a daily email.
A few months later Jonathan Wegener and Benny Wong launched PastPosts.com followed by And7YearsAgram before finally merging under a single brand Timehop.

In the summer of 2013, the company raised $3 million in funding by existing investor, Spark Capital. The funds helped build the Android version of the app.
The iOS version reached one million downloads and the app has been in the Top 200 in the U.S. App Store. In 2014, Timehop raised $10 million in Series B funding.

Controversy
In December 2016, Timehop released the 4.0 update to their app which replaced the scrolling timeline with separate pages for each entry. The update also removed a number of previous features. As a result of the update, Timehop received more than 7,000 1-star reviews in the iOS app store. Although Timehop quickly released an update which restored some of the features, it did not restore the scrolling timeline or Swarm check-ins and the app still has predominantly 1-star reviews. On January 14, 2017, TechCrunch reported that Timehop CEO and co-founder Jonathan Wegener had stepped down and was replaced by Matt Raoul, the former design lead. Wegener stated that his departure "has nothing to do with the new version.”
In early July 2018, Timehop had a network intrusion that lead to a data breach. According to the company, 21 million accounts were affected.

Devices
Timehop is a free application for IOS and Android devices which can be downloaded from the App Store or Google Play.

References

External links
 

American photography websites
Companies based in New York City
Android (operating system) software
IOS software
Companies established in 2011
2011 software